A native of Detroit, Michigan, versatile swimmer Tony Tashnick (born 1938) led his  Mackenzie Stags to a first-place trophy at the 1956 city league (DPSSAL) championships. Teaming with Howard Scarborough, JC Smith and Richard Boka; Tashnick and company sealed victory for Mackenzie by defeating Denby High in the final event. During the summer of 1956, high school All-Americans Tashnick, Scarborough and Smith competed at the United States Olympic Trials.

Two years later, Tony was US collegiate champion in the 100 & 200 yard butterfly; his double-victory led the University of Michigan to the 1958 National Collegiate Athletic Association swimming title

By the late 1950s, Tashnick had firmly established himself as one of the best all-around swimmers in the United States; setting US Open records in the 100-yard butterfly, the 200-yard butterfly, and 200-yard individual medley. In 1959, Tony competed at the Pan American Games in Chicago; finishing fourth in the 200-meter butterfly. During his senior year at the University of Michigan, team captain Tashnick swam the 200-meter butterfly at the 1960 United States Olympic Trials. In the final 20-meters of a fiercely contested race, Wolverine teammate Dave Gillanders moved ahead of Tony for the final Olympic berth. Finishing in third place, Tony Tashnick had narrowly missed a trip to the Summer Games of Rome, Italy.

References 

American male swimmers
Swimmers from Detroit
1938 births
Living people
Swimmers at the 1959 Pan American Games
Michigan Wolverines men's swimmers
Mackenzie High School (Michigan) alumni
Pan American Games competitors for the United States